Zorro and Son is an American television Western based on the character Zorro that aired on CBS. Created by Walt Disney Television, the series stars Henry Darrow as Zorro (Don Diego) and Paul Regina as his son Zorro Jr. (Don Carlos). The limited series aired for five episodes from April 6 to May 4, 1983.

It featured the same theme song by Norman Foster and George Bruns that was used on Disney's 1957 Zorro television series.

Synopsis
Set approximately twenty years after the first series, Zorro and Son is an updated, comical version of the original series.

Cast
 Henry Darrow as Don Diego de Vega (Zorro Sr.)
 Paul Regina as Don Carlos de Vega (Zorro Jr.)
 Richard Beauchamp as Sergeant Sepulveda
 Bill Dana as Bernardo
 Barney Martin as Brothers Napa and Sonoma
 John Moschitta Jr. as Corporal Cassette
 Catherine Parks as Senorita Anita
 Gregory Sierra as Captain Paco Pico

US TV ratings

Episodes

References

External links
 Zorro Productions, Inc.
 

1980s American sitcoms
1980s Western (genre) television series
1983 American television series debuts
1983 American television series endings
American television spin-offs
CBS original programming
English-language television shows
Fictional duos
Films based on works by Johnston McCulley
Television series by Disney
Television shows set in New Mexico
Zorro
Zorro television series